Bickeliolus is a genus of flies in the family Dolichopodidae. It was originally a subgenus of Ethiosciapus, but was later raised to genus rank in 1998.

Species
 Bickeliolus alluaudi (Parent, 1935)
 Bickeliolus bogoria Grichanov, 2021
 Bickeliolus haemorhoidalis (Becker, 1923)
 Bickeliolus lamellatus (Parent, 1935)
 Bickeliolus lasiophthalmus (Lamb, 1922)
 Bickeliolus maslovae (Grichanov, 1996)
 Bickeliolus trochanteralis (Curran, 1924)

Species that are now synonyms:
 Bickeliolus gerlachi (Meuffels & Grootaert, 2007): synonym of Bickeliolus alluaudi (Parent, 1935)

References 

 

Dolichopodidae genera
Sciapodinae
Diptera of Africa